Rikard Nyström (1884-1943) was a Swedish missionary. He served with the Mission Union of Sweden in Chinese Turkestan (present day Xinjiang).

External links
Mission and Change in Eastern Turkestan (English translation of select chapters of Mission och revolution i Centralasien)

Bibliography
Notes about the Tungan people, 1937
The unrest in Eastern Turkestan, 1935

1884 births
1943 deaths
Swedish Protestant missionaries
Protestant missionaries in China
Christian missionaries in Central Asia
Swedish expatriates in China